Rayco García Dauta (born 23 March 1987), known simply as Rayco, is a Spanish footballer who plays for UD San Fernando as a forward.

Club career
Born in Las Palmas, Canary Islands, Rayco began his football career with Real Madrid, first helping the Juvenil side win the Champions Cup then leading all scorers in the C team with 18 goals. In 2006–07 he made his professional debut, appearing for Real Madrid Castilla in the Segunda División. During the season, the player was brought mainly from the bench as they were eventually relegated.

After spells with Villarreal CF's reserves and amateurs CDA Navalcarnero, Rayco moved to Real Oviedo, recently promoted to Segunda División B. For 2010–11 he signed with another club in that league, Rayo Vallecano's B side.

On 11 December 2011, Rayco made his first-team – and La Liga – debut, playing the second half of a 1–3 home loss against Sporting de Gijón. In late March of the following year he terminated his contract and, shortly after, joined CD Mirandés in division two.

Rayco competed in the third tier the following years, representing CD Alcoyano, Gimnàstic de Tarragona, SD Ponferradina, Real Murcia, UD Logroñés and CD Calahorra.

References

External links

1987 births
Living people
Spanish footballers
Footballers from Las Palmas
Association football forwards
La Liga players
Segunda División players
Segunda División B players
Tercera División players
Segunda Federación players
Real Madrid C footballers
Real Madrid Castilla footballers
Villarreal CF B players
CDA Navalcarnero players
Real Oviedo players
Rayo Vallecano B players
Rayo Vallecano players
CD Mirandés footballers
CD Alcoyano footballers
Gimnàstic de Tarragona footballers
SD Ponferradina players
Real Murcia players
UD Logroñés players
CD Calahorra players
Spain youth international footballers